Dvaleti (also Tvaleti - თვალეთი) was a historical and ethnographic region in medieval Georgia. Territory in the central part of the Greater Caucasus Mountains, between Mamison Pass and Darial Gorge was associated with Dvaleti.
Dvaleti was integral part of the Georgian Kingdoms since IV centuries - III centuries BC. After the Russian annexation of the Kingdom of Kartli-Kakheti, in 1859 Dvaleti was excluded from the Tiflis Governorate and incorporated into the Terek Oblast. On modern maps historical region Dvaleti can be found in the south of North Ossetia–Alania, Russian Federation.

History 
Christianity spread in Dvaleti from the middle of the VI century. Later Dvaleti was included in the Episcopal Diocese of Nikozi. Roads from the Transcaucasia to the North Caucasus passed through Dvaleti. In the Middle Ages, the "Road to Dvaleti" was known. The fortification of the Dvaleti valleys from the north was of great importance for Georgia Kingdoms. After the Mongol invasions in XIII century Dvaleti was inhabited by Ossetian refugees from the north. The indigenous population of Dvaleti (Dvalebi), in turn, moved en masse to the south of the Caucasus. Even after the collapse of the unified Kingdom of Georgia in 15th century, Dvaleti was part of the Kingdom of Kartli. At the beginning of the 17th century Dvaleti was ruled by Giorgi Saakadze. Famous Dvali figures include 11th century clergymen: Michael Dvali, John Dvali and Svimon Dvali. Along with Eastern Georgia, Dvaleti also became part of the Russian Empire. 

Historical monuments of Dvaleti that survived till modern times include forts built at the headwaters of the rivers Ardon and Fiagdon — Kasris-karma and Khilka.

See also 
 Dvals
 South Ossetia
 Shida Kartli

References 

Former provinces of Georgia (country)
Historical regions of Georgia (country)